Beatrice Cenci is an opera by German composer Berthold Goldschmidt based on the Shelley play The Cenci. Composed in 1949 to an English libretto by Martin Esslin, the opera won first prize in the Festival of Britain opera competition in 1951 but was not performed until 1988.

Productions
1988 first staged production of Beatrice Cenci Trinity College of Music July 9–11, 1998.
1994 production with Roberta Alexander at Opernfest Berlin

Recordings
sung in English - Beatrice Cenci. Roberta Alexander (soprano), Simon Estes (bass),  Stefan Stoll, Della Jones (mezzo), Endrik Wottrich (tenor), Siegfried Lorenz (baritone), John David De Haan (tenor), Reinhard Beyer (bass), Ian Bostridge (tenor), conductor: Deutsches Symphonie-Orchester Berlin, Berlin Radio Chorus, Lothar Zagrosek 2CD Sony
sung in German, video - Beatrice Cenci. Gal James, Christoph Pohl, Dshamilja Kaiser, Prague Philharmonic Choir, Wiener Symphoniker, conducted Johannes Debus. Bregenzer Festspiele, stage director Johannes Erath, July 18, 2018

References

Operas
1949 operas
English-language operas
Operas by Berthold Goldschmidt